...I Care Because You Do is the third studio album by electronic musician Richard D. James under the alias Aphex Twin, released on 24 April 1995 by Warp. Containing material recorded between 1990 and 1994, the album marked James's return to a percussive sound following the largely beatless Selected Ambient Works Volume II (1994), and pairs abrasive rhythms with symphonic and ambient elements. The cover artwork is a self-portrait by James.

I Care Because You Do peaked at number 24 on the UK Albums Chart. It was supported by the single and EP release of the track "Ventolin". The album received positive reviews, with Entertainment Weekly, Spin, and Rolling Stone commending it as a return to form for James. It garnered comparisons to the work of composer Philip Glass, who later re-recorded the track "Icct Hedral" for James's 1995 EP Donkey Rhubarb. In 2017, Pitchfork ranked I Care Because You Do the 13th best IDM album of all time.

Composition
Each track on I Care Because You Do is annotated with a date, revealing that the tracks were created between 1990 and 1994. It was James' final album to be recorded primarily with analogue technology before he turned to digital production methods. Many of the song titles are anagrams.

According to AllMusic, the album finds James "pairing his hardcore experimentalism with more symphonic ambient material, aligned with the work of many post-classical composers" such as Philip Glass. Writer Dave Thompson described the album as "pulling together calm, serene moments then launching into battering and bruising beat-heavy tracks," observing that the rhythms shift "from trancey to hip-hoppish." Thompson also noted the influence of modern composers such as Glass. Rolling Stone stated that the music had "little to do with techno in any of its more popular guises," also comparing it to the work of composers Glass and John Cage but asserting that the album draws "most strongly from hip-hop. James' trademark is to put rhythm and percussion above all else; his beautiful, haunting melodies are relegated to the back of the mix."

Exclaim! stated that the album has been described as "occupying a middle-ground between Philip Glass and the Wu-Tang Clan."  Spin wrote that the album "showed up trip-hop laziness", while Dummy Mag described James as taking trip hop and "refashioning [the] voguish genre in his own image". Entertainment Weekly wrote that "By adding layers of soft, warm synthesizer chords over skull-grinding electronic percussion, James creates sounds that are simultaneously comforting and scary." In 2003, NME summarized the album as "a shotgun wedding of analogue rave and ambient porridge." Rolling Stone stated in 2004 that the increasingly active drum backing on the album was inspired by the presence of drum and bass music in the United Kingdom.

Release
...I Care Because You Do was released on 24 April 1995. It was released on vinyl, compact disc and cassette. It charted for two weeks in the United Kingdom, peaking at number 24 on the UK Albums Chart. I Care Because You Do was re-issued on vinyl by the record label 1972 on 18 September 2012. Warp also re-issued the album in vinyl with a download card on 8 October 2012. In 2017, the album was re-released in digital format with eight bonus tracks.

The cover artwork is a self-portrait painted by James. It was the first of several Aphex Twin releases to feature an image of his grinning face on the cover.

Following the album's release, composer Philip Glass contributed an orchestral arrangement to "Icct Hedral" that was included on the 1995 EP Donkey Rhubarb.

Reception

Select ranked the album at 42 on its "Top 50 Albums of the Year" list; saying I Care Because You Do was James's best since Surfing on Sine Waves and his "most coherent one to date", additionally stating that James had the ability to "make the avant-garde sound pop" and that he "delivers complex contemporary systems music in the most deliciously simple forms". The Sydney Morning Herald gave a positive review, surmising that "As ever, his palette of sound is astonishing, his arrangements effective and deliberate". Rolling Stone described the album as "classical music for a generation raised on samplers", stating that James was "making some of the most engaging and important music of our time."

Entertainment Weekly praised the album and called it superior to Selected Ambient Works Volume II, writing that it "reintroduces tension, more beats per minute, and sonic grime into his music" and additionally noting that it "creates sounds that are simultaneously comforting and scary – a fitting metaphor for the contemporary clash of technology and the humans befuddled by it." Spin also stated that album was superior to Selected Ambient Works Volume II as it "cut the middle of [techno]'s kitchen-sink aesthetic without sacrificing melody coherence or rhythm". Spin also described it as "a real album with its own gestalt," in which capacity it bested the "truly great" James albums Selected Ambient Works 85–92 (1992) and Classics (1995). Select later placed the album at 42nd place on their list of the best albums of 1995, referring to the album as "leftfield, sound pop brilliance".

In a retrospective of James' work in The Rolling Stone Album Guide, Sasha Frere-Jones found that the album's newer tracks were its best ones. Justin Boreta from the group The Glitch Mob publicly revisited the album in 2015, praising it for "the juxtaposition between heavy darkness and gentle depth". The A.V. Club described it as "a perfect bridge between James' implementation of experimental techno and glossy ambient." In 2017, Pitchfork ranked it the 13th best IDM album of all time.

Track listing
Each track on I Care Because You Do is annotated with the year of its recording.

Personnel
The album credits only state that "Everything by Richard D. James. Self portrait painted by me. Design help from John."

Charts

See also
 1995 in music
 Music of the United Kingdom (1990s)

Notes

References

 

Aphex Twin albums
1995 albums
Warp (record label) albums
Sire Records albums
Elektra Records albums